Ukraine competed at the 2012 Summer Olympics in London, from July 27 to August 12, 2012. This was the nation's fifth consecutive appearance at the Summer Olympics in the post-Soviet era. The National Olympic Committee of Ukraine sent a total of 238 athletes, split equally between men and women, to compete in 21 sports.

Ukraine left London with a total of 19 Olympic medals (5 gold, 4 silver, and 10 bronze), their lowest in Summer Olympic history since their debut in 1996. Five of these medals were awarded to the team in boxing; three each in athletics and sprint canoeing, and two each in fencing, shooting, and weightlifting. Two Ukrainian athletes won more than a single Olympic medal, while all of their competitors in sprint canoeing won at least a medal. For the first time in its history, Ukraine did not win an Olympic medal in archery.

Among the nation's medalists were épée fencer Yana Shemyakina and the women's quadruple sculls team, led by Yana Dementyeva, who both won Ukraine's first Olympic gold medals in their respective events. Sprint canoer Inna Osypenko, who won two silver in London, became one of the most successful Ukrainian athletes in history, with a total of four Olympic medals. Meanwhile, Yuriy Cheban won the coveted gold medal in the men's sprint canoe singles, in addition to his bronze from Beijing. Vasyl Lomachenko became the first Ukrainian boxer and twelfth in history to claim two Olympic titles. Sabre fencer Olha Kharlan defeated the reigning champion Mariel Zagunis from the United States to win the bronze medal. Track runner Yelizaveta Bryzhina followed her parents' footsteps to lead her team and win the nation's first Olympic medal in women's sprint relay. Pistol shooter Olena Kostevych recaptured her sporting success from eight years before by winning two bronze medals, in addition to her Olympic title from Athens.

Medalists

| width="78%" align="left" valign="top" |

| width="22%" align="left" valign="top" |

Delegation
The National Olympic Committee of Ukraine selected a team of 238 athletes, dividing into men and women by half, to compete in 21 sports; it was the nation's third-largest team sent to the Olympics, but the smallest since 2000. For the second consecutive time in its Olympic history, Ukraine did not qualify athletes in any of the team-based sports. Athletics was the largest team by sport, with a total of 78 competitors.

The Ukrainian team featured twelve Olympic medalists from Beijing, five of them defending (rifle hooter Artur Ayvazyan, archer Viktor Ruban, heptathlete Nataliya Dobrynska, sprint kayaker Inna Osypenko, and former featherweight boxer Vasyl Lomachenko, who competed in the men's lightweight division). 
Eights rower Oleh Lykov and windsurfer Maksym Oberemko became first Ukrainian athletes to compete in five Olympic games. Along with Ayvazyan, four Ukrainian athletes made their fourth Olympic appearance: windsurfer Olha Maslivets, pole vaulter and bronze medalist Denys Yurchenko, freestyle and open water swimmer Ihor Chervynskyy, and mountain biker Serhiy Rysenko. Rower Kostiantyn Zaitsev marked his Olympic return in London after a twelve-year absence, and competed in men's quadruple sculls. Meanwhile, former freestyle swimmer Olga Beresnyeva and long-distance runner Serhiy Lebid were among the nation's athletes who made their comeback at these Olympic games after an eight-year absence. Hammer thrower Oleksandr Dryhol, at age 46, was the oldest athlete of the team, while relay swimmer Iryna Hlavnyk was the youngest at age 16.

Other notable Ukrainian athletes featured platform diver and former Youth Olympic games medalist Oleksandr Bondar, sprint canoer and Olympic bronze medalist Yuriy Cheban, 2011 World Amateur Boxing champion Oleksandr Usyk in the men's heavyweight division, and former Olympic champions Irini Merleni in women's freestyle wrestling, Yuri Nikitin in trampoline gymnastics, and Olena Kostevych in pistol shooting. Judoka and Olympic bronze medalist Roman Gontiuk was the nation's flag bearer at the opening ceremony.

| width=78% align=left valign=top |
The following is the list of number of competitors participating in the Games. Note that reserves in fencing, field hockey, football, and handball are not counted as athletes:

Archery

Ukraine has qualified three archers for the men's individual event, three archers for the women's individual event, a team for the men's team event and a team for the women's team event.

Previously, Ukraine has won a total of five Olympic medals in archery, one gold, one silver, and two bronze. Archer Viktor Ruban, the defending champion of the men's individual archery competition from the Beijing Olympics, managed to qualify into three consecutive rounds, until he was lost in the quarterfinal round by Korea's Oh Jin-Hyek, who later won the gold medal and then succeeded Ruban's Olympic title during the final rounds of the competition.

Men

Women

Athletics

Ukrainian athletes have so far achieved qualifying standards in the following athletics events (up to a maximum of 3 athletes in each event at the 'A' Standard, and 1 at the 'B' Standard):

Men
Track & road events

Field events

* On 9 August 2016, IOC announced that Oleksandr Pyatnytsya of Ukraine has been disqualified from the 2012 Summer Olympics and ordered to return the silver medal from the men's javelin throw event. Reanalysis of his samples from London 2012 resulted in a positive test for the prohibited substance dehydrochlormethyltestosterone (turinabol).

Combined events – Decathlon

Women
Track & road events

* Viktoriya Pyatachenko was selected in the women's 4 × 100 m relay, but did not compete.

Field events

Combined events – Heptathlon

Badminton

Boxing

Ukraine has qualified seven boxers at the London games. This was, by far, Ukraine's best performance at the Olympic games, after winning all but two medals in London. Five of them were awarded to the team, including two gold medals won by lightweight boxer Vasyl Lomachenko and heavyweight boxer Oleksandr Usyk. Lomachenko, former Olympic champion in the men's featherweight division at Beijing, was also the first boxer to win more than a single title in its history.

Men

Canoeing

Sprint
Ukraine has qualified boats for the following events

Qualification Legend: FA = Qualify to final (medal); FB = Qualify to final B (non-medal)

Cycling

Ukraine has qualified in the following events

Road

Track
Sprint

Team sprint

Pursuit

Keirin

Mountain biking

Diving

Men

Women

Equestrian

Ukraine has qualified a team (four athletes) for Show jumping and one individual for Dressage for the Games.

Dressage

Jumping

Fencing

Ukraine has qualified 8 fencers.

Men

Women

Gymnastics

Artistic
Men
Team

Individual finals

Women

Rhythmic

Trampoline

Judo

Men

Women

Modern pentathlon

Ukraine has qualified two men and two women

* Did not finish

Rowing

Ukraine has qualified the following boats

Men

Women

Qualification Legend: FA=Final A (medal); FB=Final B (non-medal); FC=Final C (non-medal); FD=Final D (non-medal); FE=Final E (non-medal); FF=Final F (non-medal); SA/B=Semifinals A/B; SC/D=Semifinals C/D; SE/F=Semifinals E/F; QF=Quarterfinals; R=Repechage

Sailing

Ukraine has qualified 1 boat for each of the following events

Men

Women

M = Medal race; EL = Eliminated – did not advance into the medal race;
Scoring abbreviations are defined as follows:
OCS – On course side of the starting line; DSQ – Disqualified; DNF – Did not finish; DNS – Did not start. RDG – Redress given.

Shooting

Ukraine has ensured berths in the following events of shooting:

Men

Women

Swimming

Ukrainian swimmers have so far achieved qualifying standards in the following events (up to a maximum of 2 swimmers in each event at the Olympic Qualifying Time (OQT), and 1 at the Olympic Selection Time (OST)):

Men

Women

Synchronized swimming

Ukraine has qualified 2 quota places in Synchronized swimming.

Table tennis

Ukraine has qualified the following athletes

Taekwondo

Ukraine has qualified 2 athletes.

Tennis

Triathlon

Ukraine has qualified the following athletes.

Weightlifting

Ukraine has qualified 6 men and 3 women.

Men

Women

* On 13 July 2016, IOC announced that Yuliya Kalina has been disqualified and ordered to return the bronze medal from the 58 kg weightlifting event.
* On 19 December 2019, IOC announced that Oleksiy Torokhtiy has been disqualified and ordered to return the gold medal from the 105 kg weightlifting event.

Wrestling

Ukraine has qualified in the following events

Men's freestyle

Men's Greco-Roman

Women's freestyle

Uniforms
The uniforms worn at the opening and closing ceremonies by Ukraine's Olympic athletes were designed by a Russian firm Bosco, the same firm that designed the uniforms for the athletes of the Russian Federation and Spain.

Ukrainian athletes wore Bosco uniforms for the first time at the 2008 Summer Olympics in Beijing. The same firm is expected to design the uniforms for Ukraine’s Olympic team at the 2014 Winter Olympics in Sochi and the 2016 Summer Olympics in Rio de Janeiro. The uniforms are provided free of charge to the team members.

The style is of the early 1970s in patterns and colors that reflect the culture of freedom-loving Ukraine. For men, bell-bottoms, colorful shirts with pointed collars single-breasted jackets with wide lapels, and traditional hats. For women capri pants, tunics and short vests, colorful scarves and fringed bags. The design incorporates the blue and yellow colors of the Ukrainian flag and a stylized shaft of wheat, the traditional national symbol of Ukraine.

References

Summer Olympics
Nations at the 2012 Summer Olympics
2012